The 9th FINA Synchronised Swimming World Cup was held September 8–12, 1999, in Seoul, Korea. It featured swimmers from 12 nations, swimming in three events: Solo, Duet, and Team.

Participating nations
12 nations swam at the 1999 Synchro World Cup:

Results

Point standings

References

FINA Synchronized Swimming World Cup
1999 in synchronized swimming
International aquatics competitions hosted by South Korea
2014 in South Korean sport
Synchronized swimming in South Korea